Lootens or Looten is a surname. Notable people with the surname include:

Charles L. Lootens (1900–1994), American sound engineer
Christophe Looten (born 1958), French composer
Jan Looten (1617/1618–c.1681), Dutch landscape painter
Julien Lootens (1876–1942), Belgian cyclist
Lena Lootens, Dutch soprano
Louis Aloysius Lootens (1827–1898), Belgian-born Canadian Catholic prelate